The Federal Correctional Institution, Safford (FCI Safford) is a low-security United States federal prison for male inmates in Arizona. It is operated by the Federal Bureau of Prisons, a division of the United States Department of Justice.

FCI Safford is located in southeastern Arizona, 7 miles south of the city of Safford, 127 miles northeast of Tucson, and 165 miles east of Phoenix.

Inmate life
All inmates are required to work in some capacity. Inmates are normally placed on a job assignment most compatible with his interest or job skill. Inmates with severe financial needs will be considered for priority placement on the waiting list in Federal Prison Industries (UNICOR). The regular work day for the inmate population starts at 7:30 am and lasts until 3:30 pm Some work details stagger schedules such as UNICOR, food service, laundry, recreation, and the unit orderlies. UNICOR employs large numbers of inmates and specializes in the production of textile products for sale to governmental agencies.

Programs and services
Inmates who have not yet attained their high school diploma are required to attend a General Educational Development (GED) program. A variety of college level courses are offered in a classroom setting through Eastern Arizona College, as well as through correspondence. Vocational training programs are also available.

Notable inmates (current and former)

† Inmates who were released from custody prior to 1982 are not listed on the Federal Bureau of Prisons website.

See also 

 List of United States federal prisons
 Federal Bureau of Prisons
 Incarceration in the United States

References

External links 
 Federal Correctional Institution, Safford – Official

Prisons in Arizona
Federal Correctional Institutions in the United States
Safford, Arizona
Buildings and structures in Graham County, Arizona